9 Corps (IX Corps), also known as Rising Star Corps was raised in 2005 and is Indian Army's youngest corps

History 
It was raised on September 1, 2005 by splitting the southern formations of Nagrota-based XVI ‘White Knight’ Corps, which forms part of the Udhampur based Northern Command. It is presently part of Army's Chandimandir based Western Command and encompasses parts of Punjab, Jammu and Kashmir and Himachal Pradesh.

The first General Officer Commanding was Lieutenant General Anup Singh Jamwal, who had successfully commanded 4 Corps in the North East.

Order of Battle 
The 9 Corps consists of the following-
26 Infantry Division (Tiger Division) headquartered at Jammu
29 Infantry Division (Gurj Division) headquartered at Pathankot
2 (Independent) Armoured Brigade (Fleur-de-lis Brigade) (former 252nd Indian Armoured Brigade)
3 (Independent) Armoured Brigade (Sabre Brigade)
16 (Independent) Armoured Brigade (Black Arrow Brigade) (Dec 1971 placed under 54 Infantry Division)
84 Infantry Brigade
401 (Independent) Artillery Brigade (Arsenals Brigade)

List of Commanders

Notes

References 
Richard A. Renaldi and Ravi Rikhe, 'Indian Army Order of Battle,' Orbat.com for Tiger Lily Books: A division of General Data LLC, 2011.

009
Military units and formations established in 2005
2005 establishments in Himachal Pradesh